Tanner Island is the westernmost and largest of the Pickersgill Islands, rising to 145m off the south coast of South Georgia. Named by United Kingdom Antarctic Place-Names Committee (UK-APC) for Dr. P.W.G. Tanner, a British Antarctic Survey (BAS) geologist who worked on the island during the 1975-76 field season.

See also 
 List of Antarctic and sub-Antarctic islands

Islands of South Georgia